The Bizzarrini 5300 GT S.I. Spyder was a series of three cars created in 1966 based on the Bizzarrini Strada. They were designed by the unknown carrozzeria Stile Italia (S.I.), via Governolo 28 in Torino and built in cooperation with Sibona & Basano. The name Spyder had an "y" in it for marketing reasons, because the Italian alphabet does not know that letter as such. The first appearance was at the Geneva Motor Show in 1966, after a traffic accident of the transporter who brought the car(s) to the show. The present owner of the two of these three Spyders, Mark Sassak, clearly defines the differences between these cars. Of the three Spyders built, one is painted silver and is a full convertible, while the other two feature removable T-tops with a center bar running through the middle of the roof. The engine was a Chevrolet 327 V8 with four Weber carburetors.

References

Sources
Bizzarrini, "The Genius behind Ferrari's Success" (book).

External links
 Bizzarrini 5300 Spyder S.I.

Bizzarrini 5300 Spyder S.I.